This page lists the albums that reached number one on the Top R&B/Hip-Hop Albums and Top Rap Albums charts in 2008. The Rap Albums chart partially serves as a distillation of rap-specific titles from the overall R&B/Hip-Hop Albums chart.

Chart history

See also
2008 in music
2008 in hip hop music
List of number-one R&B singles of 2008 (U.S.)
List of Billboard 200 number-one albums of 2008

References 

2008
2008
United States RandB Hip Hop Albums